Events from 2011 in Switzerland.

Events
Public holidays in one or several cantons of Switzerland are marked (¹).

January
January 1: New Year's Day¹
January 2: Berchtoldstag¹

February

March
March 19:Saint Joseph's Day
March 29:Good Friday
March 31:Easter Day

April
April 1:Easter Monday

May
May–June-2011 Germany E. coli O104:H4 outbreak affected Switzerland
May 1:May Day
May 9:Ascension Day
May 19:Pentecost
May 20:Whit Monday
May 30:Corpus Christi

June
June 16-Convention on Domestic Workers signed, took place in Geneva

July
July 2-Some Swiss tourists were kidnapped in Balochistan
July 25-July 31-2011 Crédit Agricole Suisse Open Gstaad was in play

August
August-August 2011 stock markets fall affected the Swiss Franc
August 1:Swiss National Day
August 15:Assumption of Mary
August 17-August 21-2011 Basel Summer Ice Hockey was in play

September
September 16:Swiss federal fast

October
October 31-November 6-2011 Swiss Indoors was in play

November
November 1:All Saints' Day
November 25-27-2011 International ZO Women's Tournament was in play

December
December 8:Feast of the Immaculate Conception
December 15-December 22-Cyclone Joachim affected Switzerland
December 24:Christmas Eve
December 25:Christmas Day
December 26:St. Stephen's Day
December 26-December 31-2011 Spengler Cup was in play
December 31:New Year's Eve

Incumbents

Establishments
Anti-PowerPoint Party
Propulsion Universelle et Recuperation d'Energie
Swiss Accident Investigation Board

Deaths
Erhard Loretan died climbing in the Alps
December 7-Clemens Thoma

See also 
 :de:Feiertage in der Schweiz (Public holidays in Switzerland)
 Deaths in 2011
 List of Swiss people
 List of number-one hits of 2011 (Switzerland)

References

 
Switzerland